Laws of Gravity is a 1992 American crime drama film written and directed by Nick Gomez and starring Peter Greene.

Plot
Jimmy and Johnny are two Brooklyn street toughs who never made it into workaday society. Danger is the hit that gets them out of bed. Jimmy owes a loan shark money and Johnny is wanted by the police. Things go further out of control when their old friend Frankie arrives in a stolen car with a trunkload of guns for sale.

Cast
 Peter Greene as Jimmy
 Edie Falco as Denise
 Adam Trese as Jon
 Arabella Field as Celia
 Paul Schulze as Frankie
 Saul Stein as Sal
 Tony Fernandez as Tommy
 Larry Meistrich as Pete
 James Michael McCauley as Kenny (as James McCauley)
 Rick Groel as Kevin
 Anibal O. Lleras as Rey (as Anibel Leirras)
 John Gallagher as Bobby
 David Troup as Sullivan
 Miguel Sierra as Vasquez
 David Tuttle as Ted

References

External links

1992 films
1992 crime drama films
American crime drama films
American independent films
Films directed by Nick Gomez
1992 directorial debut films
1992 independent films
1990s English-language films
1990s American films